Charles H. Nesbitt, known as Charlie Nesbitt, is an American politician from the State of New York.

A Republican, Nesbitt was first elected to the New York State Assembly in 1992. Before serving in the Assembly, he was a member of the Albion Town Council. He represented the 137th Assembly District, which encompassed portions of Genesee, Monroe, Orleans, and Niagara counties. Nesbitt held the post of Assembly Minority Leader from 2002 to 2005. In 2005, he was appointed to the New York Tax Appeals Tribunal by Gov. George Pataki; he served as president of that body. In February 2020, Assembly Minority Leader Will Barclay appointed Nesbitt to New York's Independent Redistricting Commission. As of 2020, Nesbitt resides in the Town of Albion in Orleans County, New York.

References

|-

|-

1947 births
Living people
Republican Party members of the New York State Assembly
People from Albion, Orleans County, New York